Calloway may refer to:

People
 A.J. Calloway, American TV personality
 Auburn Calloway, flight engineer of FedEx Express who nearly hijacked FedEx Flight 705
 Blanche Calloway, American jazz singer, bandleader, and composer
 Cab Calloway, an American jazz singer and bandleader
 Colin G. Calloway, American historian
 Don Calloway, member-elect of the Missouri House of Representatives
 Doris Calloway (1923–2001), American nutritionist 
 Ernie Calloway, American football player
 Horace Calloway, fictional character
 James Nathan Calloway, American agriculturalist
 Jordan Calloway, American actor
 Northern J. Calloway, actor on Sesame Street
 Sway Calloway, MTV reporter and producer
 Vanessa Bell Calloway, American actor

Other
 Calloway  (band), American pop music group featuring the Calloway brothers – Reginald and Vincent
 Calloway County, Kentucky
 Calloway School of Business and Accountancy

See also 
 Calaway, several people
 Callaway (disambiguation)
 Galloway (disambiguation)
 Kellaway, several people